The Lukunsky grove is a forest in Krasnoyarsk Krai, Russia, on the southern bank of the Lukunsk River, to the south of the Khatanga River. It is the northernmost forest extension in the world.

Climate
The vegetation period is approximately 100 days long. Winter lasts from the late September or early October to June, with minimum temperatures often falling below .

The polar day lasts from early May to early August.

Biodiversity
The only tree species of the Lukunsky grove is the Dahurian larch (Larix gmelinii (Rupr.) Rupr.)), but in total there are 268 species of plants, 78 species of birds, and 16 species of mammals. The species composition shows that Lukunsky grove is rather a part of taiga and not tundra. The Lukunsky grove forms a northern part of a wider forest massif extending for hundreds of kilometres to the south.

Conservation and scientific investigations
It forms a part of Taymyr State Nature Biosphere Reserve and has been protected since 1979.

Scientific studies in the Lukunsky grove are led by the Taymyr State Nature Biosphere Reserve and major part of results are compiled in yearly nature reports.

References

External links
 Wondermondo, Lukunsky grove - the northernmost forest
 State Nature Biosphere Reserve "Taymyrsky"

Forests of Russia
Extreme points of Earth